In category theory, a branch of mathematics, the center (or Drinfeld center, after Soviet-American mathematician Vladimir Drinfeld) is a variant of the notion of the center of a monoid, group, or ring to a category.

Definition

 

and

  (this is actually a consequence of the first axiom).

An arrow from (A,u) to (B,v) in  consists of an arrow  in  such that

.
Equivalently, the center may be defined as

i.e., the endofunctors of C which are compatible with the left and right action of C on itself given by the tensor product.

Braiding

The category  becomes a braided monoidal category with the tensor product on objects defined as

where , and the obvious braiding.

Higher categorical version

The categorical center is particularly useful in the context of higher categories. This is illustrated by the following example: the center of the (abelian) category  of R-modules, for a commutative ring R, is  again. The center of a monoidal ∞-category C can be defined, analogously to the above, as
.

Extending the above-mentioned braiding on the center of an ordinary monoidal category, the center of a monoidal ∞-category becomes an -monoidal category. More generally, the center of a -monoidal category is an algebra object in -monoidal categories and therefore, by Dunn additivity, an -monoidal category.

Examples

 has shown that the Drinfeld center of the category of sheaves on an orbifold X is  the category of sheaves on the inertia orbifold of X. For X being the classifying space of a finite group G, the inertia orbifold is the stack quotient G/G, where G acts on itself by conjugation. For this special case, Hinich's result specializes to the assertion that the center of the category of G-representations (with respect to some ground field k) is equivalent to the category consisting of G-graded k-vector spaces, i.e., objects of the form

for some k-vector spaces, together with G-equivariant morphisms, where G acts on itself by conjugation.

In the same vein,  have shown that Drinfeld center of the derived category of quasi-coherent sheaves on a perfect stack X is the derived category of sheaves on the loop stack of X.

Related notions

Centers of monoid objects
The center of a monoid and the Drinfeld center of a monoidal category are both instances of the following more general concept. Given a monoidal category C and a monoid object A in C, the center of A is defined as

For C being the category of sets (with the usual cartesian product), a monoid object is simply a monoid, and Z(A) is the center of the monoid. Similarly, if C is the category of abelian groups, monoid objects are rings, and the above recovers the center of a ring. Finally, if C is the category of categories, with the product as the monoidal operation, monoid objects in C are monoidal categories, and the above recovers the Drinfeld center.

Categorical trace
The categorical trace of a monoidal category (or monoidal ∞-category) is defined as 

References 

 
 
.

External links

Category theory
Monoidal categories